"Slow Jams" is a song by American musician Quincy Jones, taken from his studio album Q's Jook Joint (1995). Written and produced by Rod Temperton, vocals for the song were initially recorded by Babyface, Portrait, Barry White and Coko. A remix version, released in 1996 as the album's second single, replaced the latter's vocals with Tamia. A commercial success, it peaked at number 2 on the New Zealand Singles Chart and reached the top 20 on Billboards  Hot R&B Songs chart. The remix version featuring Tamia earned a nomination for Best R&B Performance by a Duo or Group with Vocals at the 39th Grammy Awards in 1997.

Charts

Weekly charts

Year-end charts

Certifications

References

1995 songs
1996 singles
Quincy Jones songs
Tamia songs
Barry White songs
Song recordings produced by Quincy Jones
Songs written by Rod Temperton
Contemporary R&B ballads
1990s ballads
Qwest Records singles